The Black River Wildlife Management Area is located along the Black River (also known as the Lamington River) in Chester Township of Morris County, New Jersey. The Patriots' Path follows an abandoned branch of the Delaware, Lackawanna and Western Railroad along the river.

Other parks in the Black River valley are the Black River County Park and the Hacklebarney State Park.

See also
 List of New Jersey wildlife management areas

References

External links
 
 https://web.archive.org/web/20080513143014/http://www.outdoorphotographer.com/content/2007/may/fp_jersey.shtml
 http://www.nynjctbotany.org/njhigh/blkriver.html

Chester Township, New Jersey
Protected areas of Morris County, New Jersey
Wildlife management areas of New Jersey